Small Time Crooks is a 2000 American crime-comedy film written and directed by Woody Allen, the film's plot has some similarities to that of the 1942 comedy Larceny, Inc. It stars Allen, Hugh Grant, Elaine May and Tracey Ullman.

Small Time Crooks received positive reviews from critics. Ullman also received a nomination for a Golden Globe Award for Best Actress – Motion Picture Comedy or Musical, and May won the Best Supporting Actress citation at the National Society of Film Critics Awards.

Plot
Career criminal Ray and his cronies want to lease a closed pizzeria so they can dig a tunnel from the basement of the restaurant to a nearby bank. Ray's wife Frenchy covers what they are doing by selling cookies in the restaurant. The robbery scheme soon proves to be a miserable failure, but, after they franchise the business, selling cookies makes them millionaires.

One day Frenchy throws a big party and overhears people making fun of their poor decorating taste and lack of culture. She asks an art dealer named David to train her and Ray so they can fit in with the American upper class. Ray hates every minute of it, but Frenchy likes their new culture.

What Frenchy does not know is that David is really just using her to finance his art projects. Ray finally gets fed up and leaves Frenchy. David and Frenchy go to Europe for more cultural enlightenment and while there, she gets a call and finds out she has been defrauded by her accountants. She has lost everything, including her cookie company, home, and possessions. David turns on her right away and immediately dumps her.

Meanwhile, Ray has gone back to being a crook and tries to steal a valuable necklace at a party. He has had a duplicate made and through a series of circumstances gets the duplicate and real one mixed up. At the party, he finds out that Frenchy is broke, so he leaves and goes to see her. He consoles her by saying he stole the valuable necklace and shows it to her. Her new-found cultural enlightenment enables her to tell the necklace is a fake; Ray has gotten the wrong one. But she produces a very expensive cigarette case that she once had given to David as a gift but stole back after he dumped her. It once belonged to the Duke of Windsor. They reconcile, decide to sell it, and retire to Florida.

Cast

Reception

Box office
Small Time Crooks opened up on the same day as Dinosaur and Road Trip and was the highest-grossing film directed by Allen at the North American box office between 1989's Crimes and Misdemeanors and 2005's Match Point, with a gross of $17.2 million. However, it was also one of the few later Allen films which did less well outside the U.S. and Canada, and its global gross was $29.9 million.

Critical response
On Rotten Tomatoes the film has an approval rating of 66% based on reviews from 100 critics, with an average rating of 6.3/10. The website's critical consensus reads, "Woody Allen rises from his recent slump with Small Time Crooks. A simple, funny movie, Crooks proves Allen still has the touch that made his name synonymous with off-beat comedy." On Metacritic the film has an average score of 69 out of 100, based on reviews from 32 critics, indicating "generally positive reviews". Audiences surveyed by CinemaScore gave the film a grade "B" on scale of A to F.

Stephen Holden of The New York Times wrote: "In this sweet, funny wisp of a movie, Mr. Allen shucks off his fabled angst and returns in spirit to those wide-eyed days of yesteryear, before Chekhov, Kafka and Ingmar Bergman invaded his creative imagination."
Todd McCarthy of Variety magazine called it a "Breezy, enjoyable romp gratifyingly zigzags in directions that aren't apparent at the outset and features some intriguingly personal subtext for longtime Woody watchers."
Roger Ebert of the Chicago Sun-Times gave it 3 out of 4, and wrote: "Dumb as they (allegedly) are, the characters in Small Time Crooks are smarter, edgier and more original than the dreary crowd in so many new comedies."

Allen has never said whether the film's similarity to Larceny, Inc. was deliberate or if his film was in any way inspired by it. The plot also parallels episodes of at least two American TV series: Gomer Pyle ("Dynamite Diner") and Car 54, Where Are You? ("The White Elephant").

Accolades
Ullman was nominated for a Golden Globe Award for Best Actress – Motion Picture Musical or Comedy for her performance, and Elaine May won Best Supporting Actress at the National Society of Film Critics Awards for her performance.

Soundtrack

 With Plenty of Money and You - Music by Harry Warren - Performed by Hal Kemp
 Could It Be - Written by Stephen Lang - Performed by Stephen Lang
 Stompin' at the Savoy - Written by Edgar M. Sampson, Benny Goodman & Chick Webb - Performed by Benny Goodman and His Orchestra
 Music Makers - Written by Harry James & Don Raye - Performed by Harry James
 Voices of Spring Waltzes Fruhlingstimmen op.11 - Written by Johann Strauss - Performed by Vienna State Opera Orchestra
 Cocktails for Two - Music by Arthur Johnston - Performed by Carmen Cavallaro
 Tequila - Written by Danny Flores - Performed by The Champs
 The Modern Dance - Written by Scott Marshall - Performed by Judith Cohn, Carol Genetti & Scott Marshall
 Prelude in B minor opus 32, #10 - Written by Sergei Rachmaninoff
 Fascination - Music by Fermo Dante Marchetti - Performed by Carmen Cavallaro
 Mountain Greenery - Music by Richard Rodgers - Performed by Lester Lanin
 Zelda's Theme - Written by André Previn - Performed by Dámaso Pérez Prado
 Sarabande From the Suite #2 for Solo violoncello In D Minor - Written by Johann Sebastian Bach
 Lester Lanin Cha-Cha - Written by Lester Lanin - Performed by Lester Lanin
 This Could Be the Start of Something Big - Written by Steve Allen - Performed by Lester Lanin
 Just in Time - Music by Jule Styne - Performed by Lester Lanin
 Old Devil Moon - Music by Burton Lane - Performed by Lester Lanin
 The Hukilau Song - Written by Jack Owens - Performed by Lester Lanin
 Steady, Steady - Written by Ronald Graham & Milton Shafer - Performed by Lester Lanin

See also
 Woody Allen bibliography
 Woody Allen filmography

References

External links

 
 
 

2000 films
2000 crime films
2000s crime comedy films
2000s heist films
American crime comedy films
American heist films
DreamWorks Pictures films
Films about bank robbery
Films about marriage
Films directed by Woody Allen
Films produced by Jean Doumanian
Films set in New York City
Films shot in New Jersey
Films shot in New York City
Films with screenplays by Woody Allen
2000 comedy films
2000s English-language films
2000s American films